Lovečkovice is a municipality and village in Litoměřice District in the Ústí nad Labem Region of the Czech Republic. It has about 600 inhabitants.

Administrative parts
Villages of Dolní Šebířov, Hlupice, Knínice, Levínské Petrovice, Mukařov, Náčkovice and Touchořiny are administrative parts of Lovečkovice.

References

Villages in Litoměřice District